The 12th Ryder Cup Matches were held 4–5 October 1957 at Lindrick Golf Club near Worksop, England. The Great Britain team, led by captain Dai Rees, beat the United States team by a score of 7 to 4 points, and won the Ryder Cup for the first time since 1933.

On the first day of competition was the Americans dominated the foursomes, winning three of the four matches. Dick Mayer and Tommy Bolt's 7 & 5 win over Britain's Christy O'Connor and Eric Brown was the largest margin of victory on day one.

The British rallied on the second day of competition, starting with the first two singles matches. Brown recorded a 4 & 3 victory over Bolt, and Peter Mills defeated U.S. captain Jack Burke Jr. to draw Britain level at 3 to 3. The Americans responded when Fred Hawkins won his match against Peter Alliss, however Britain won the next four matches.  Great Britain won the Ryder Cup when O'Connor defeated Dow Finsterwald, giving the British team 7 points. Harry Bradshaw and Mayer halved the final singles match to bring the final score to 7 to 4, with Britain gaining 6 points in the eight singles matches.

Dai Rees therefore became only the third - and final - captain of the Great Britain side to lift the Ryder Cup as winning captain. Great Britain would never win the Ryder Cup again, and the Great Britain & Ireland team that competed in 1973, 1975 and 1977 never won the cup. It would not be until 1985 that a non-American (Tony Jacklin, as captain of the Europe team) would lift the trophy.

Format
The Ryder Cup is a match play event, with each match worth one point.  From 1927 through 1959, the format consisted of 4 foursome (alternate shot) matches on the first day and 8 singles matches on the second day, for a total of 12 points.  Therefore, 6 points were required to win the Cup.  All matches were played to a maximum of 36 holes.

Sir Stuart Goodwin
The event was financially supported by Sir Stuart Goodwin, a Yorkshire steel industrialist. He had sponsored a foursomes tournament, the Goodwin (Sheffield) Foursomes Tournament, in 1952, 1953 and 1954 with prize money of £3,000 and another in 1956, the Stuart C. Goodwin Tournament, with prize money of £5,250. The £5,250 was the largest ever for a British golf event surpassing the £3,750 at the 1956 Open. All the tournaments were held in the Sheffield area, the 1953 event being held at Lindrick.

He offered the P.G.A. £10,000 to host the match at Lindrick, the gate money going to the P.G.A. who were responsible for all payments in connection with the match. With gate receipts of £16,127 the £10,000 donation enabled the P.G.A. to make a record profit of about £11,000 out of the event.

He later made a gift of £5,000 to the R&A to help promote the Walker Cup and games with Commonwealth countries.

In 1959 Goodwin sponsored the Sherwood Forest Foursomes Tournament, which had prize money of £2,100.

Goodwin was President of Lindrick Golf Club from 1958 to 1960. In 1960 Lindrick hosted the Curtis Cup. Goodwin gave the Ladies' Golf Union a gift of £2,000 to help stage the event and also guaranteed the LGU and Lindrick Golf Club against financial loss. Goodwin was a vice-president of the LGU.

Teams
Source: 

A new system of selection was used for the Great Britain team. A points system based on performances over a two-year period ending after the 1957 Open Championship was used. Winners of the 1957 Open Championship and the 1957 News of the World Match Play were guaranteed places provided they were British. The remaining places to complete the team of 10 were selected from the points list. Following the 1957 Open, nine places were finalised, the leading nine in the point list: Brown, Weetman, Bradshaw, Bousfield, Alliss, Rees, Faulkner, O'Connor and Hunt. Mills was 10th in the list. Rees was again chosen as the captain. With O'Connor winning the News of the World Match Play, Mills became the last member of the team.

The 1957 Amateurs–Professionals Match was played at Lindrick in early August. It was intended that the match would be between the Ryder Cup and Walker Cup teams, to give both teams some competitive experience and for the Ryder Cup team to gain experience of the Lindrick course. In the event, two of the Ryder Cup team, Christy O'Connor Snr and Harry Weetman were ill and replaced by Eric Lester and local professional, 49-year-old Jack Jacobs.

Notables absent from the U.S. team included Sam Snead, Jimmy Demaret, and Cary Middlecoff; Ben Hogan last played in 1951.

Friday's foursome matches

18 hole scores: Ford/Finsterwald: 1 up, Bousfield/Rees v Wall/Hawkins: all square, Kroll/Burke: 1 up, Mayer/Bolt: 3 up.

Saturday's singles matches

18 hole scores: Brown: 4 up, Mills: 5 up, Hawkins: 1 up, Bousfield: 5 up, Rees: 4 up, Hunt: 1 up, O'Connor/Finsterwald: all square, Mayer: 1 up.

Weetman suspension
At a meeting on 21 October, Harry Weetman was suspended by the executive committee of the P.G.A. for twelve months. This was following his actions after being left out of the second day singles matches. Weetman had declared that he would never play in any Ryder Cup again if Rees were the captain. Weetman was unable to play in P.G.A. events. The decision was upheld at the annual meeting of the P.G.A. in November. Following an appeal from Rees the P.G.A. lifted the suspension on 17 April 1958.

Individual player records
Each entry refers to the win–loss–half record of the player.

Source:

Great Britain

United States

References

External links
PGA of America: 1957 Ryder Cup
About.com: 1957 Ryder Cup

Ryder Cup
Golf tournaments in England
Sport in South Yorkshire
Ryder Cup
Ryder Cup
Ryder Cup